AfroBasket 2017 qualification occurred on various dates on 2017. It determined which African national basketball teams qualified for the 2017 FIBA Africa Championship. Teams competed with other teams in their respective "zones" for a spot in the Championship tournament.

Qualified Teams
Two teams qualified for the tournament before the qualification round will take place. Fourteen more teams claimed spots in the tournament through Zonal Qualifying.

Zones

Zone 1
Zone 1 was played from March 16 to April 1, 2017, in Algeria and Tunisia.

First leg

Second leg

Zone 2
The qualifiers were played in a tournament played over two legs with the two top teams qualified. The first leg of the qualifier was played in Bamako on 19 March with the return game following in Dakar a week later.

First leg

Second leg

Zone 3

First leg

Second leg

Zone 4

Group 1

Group 2

Zone 5
Eight teams will play a round-robin format tournament - from 12 to 18 March in Cairo, Egypt - to secure the two places for the Final Round.

Group A

Group B

Classification Games

Semi-final

Third-place game

Final

Zone 6 and Zone 7
The winner of each group will secure automatic qualification for Africa's flagship competition taking place in Brazzaville, while the teams that finish second in Groups G and H will face each other for the remaining qualification spot.

Group 1 
Group 1 will be played from 25 to 30 March in Lusaka, Zambia to secure one place for the Final Round.

Group 2
Group 2 will be played from 19 to 25 March in Harare, Zimbabwe to secure one place for the Final Round.

Playoff game

Wildcard
FIBA Africa's executive committee on Tuesday, 18 April awarded the two wild cards for FIBA AfroBasket 2017 to Guinea and Rwanda.

Qualifying tournament
Chad, the Central African Republic and Zimbabwe faced off in Bamako, Mali from 19 to 21 May, with the winner of this additional qualifier filling the void left by the Republic of Congo.

References

External links
 AfroBasket 2017 Qualifiers

AfroBasket qualification
qualification